The Maryland Steamer automobile was manufactured in Luke, Maryland in 1900 and 1901

History 
The Maryland Automobile Manufacturing company developed a runabout with a two-cylinder vertical steam engine and a chain drive. In December 1900 the factory was blown down by gale force winds. The factory was insured and production continued in 1901. The Company offered bodies as a Tourist Carriage, Runabout, Surrey, Phaeton, Omnibus, Delivery Wagon and Racing Machine.  The company was reported in receivership by May 1901. The factory became a bottling plant.

References

External Links 
Maryland Automobile Manufacturing Co. at the Virtual Steam Car Museum
Defunct motor vehicle manufacturers of the United States
Steam cars
Veteran vehicles
1900s cars
Motor vehicle manufacturers based in Maryland